was a lieutenant general in the Japanese Imperial Army during World War II. He was commander of the Japanese garrison in Chichijima, Ogasawara Islands, and was later tried and executed for the Chichijima incident, a war crime involving torture, extrajudicial execution and cannibalism of American prisoners of war.

Biography

Early life and military career
Tachibana was a native of Ehime Prefecture. After graduating from a private school, he attended the 25th class of Imperial Japanese Army Academy and graduated in 1913. He had a relatively undistinguished early career as an officer. From September 1916 to January, he studied gymnastics at the Army Toyama School. He was promoted to captain in August 1923 and in March 1924 commanded a battalion of the IJA 12th Infantry Regiment. He subsequently served on the staff of the IJA 11th Division and was sent as an Army representative to the Takamatsu Commercial High School. He became a major in August 1930 and lieutenant colonel in August 1935. During the mid-1930s he was assigned to the Manchukuo Imperial Army as a liaison officer. In August 1939, he was given command of the IJA 65th Infantry Regiment, which saw combat at the Battle of Zaoyang–Yichang in the Second Sino-Japanese War. 

In 1942, Tachibana was assigned to the staff of the Hiroshima regional defense command, and promoted to major general in March 1943. In May 1944, he became commander of the IJA 1st Independent Combined Brigade, which was tasked with the defense of the Ogasawara Islands against invasion by American forces in the preliminary preparations to Operation Downfall. He was further promoted to lieutenant general on March 23, 1945 and given command of the IJA 109th Division.

World War II 
By mid-1945, due to the Allied naval blockade, the 25,000 Japanese troops on Chichijima had run low on supplies. However, although the daily ration of rice had been reduced from 400g per person a day to 240g, the troops were in no risk of starvation. In what later came to be called the Chichijima incident, and February/March 1945 Tachibana's senior staff turned to cannibalism. Nine American airmen escaped from their planes after being shot down during bombing raids on Chichijima, eight of whom were captured. The ninth, the only one to evade capture, was future US President George H. W. Bush, then a 20-year-old pilot.  Over a period of several months, the prisoners were executed, and allegedly by the order of Tachibana, who was known to his staff as a sadistic, alcoholic commander, their bodies were butchered by the division's medical orderlies and the livers and other organs consumed by the senior staff. 

At the end of the war, Tachibana and his staff were arrested by the American occupation authorities and were deported to Guam, where they stood trial for war crimes in connection with the Chichijima Incident in August 1946. However, as cannibalism was not covered under international law at the time, Tachibana was charged with "prevention of honorable burial." Tachibana was sentenced to death by hanging along with four other defendants. He and the other defendants executed were buried in unmarked graves on Guam.

Decorations
 1945 –  Order of the Sacred Treasure, 2nd class

See also
Japanese war crimes
Flyboys: A True Story of Courage

References

External links

 Surrender of Bonin Islands, September 3, 1945
 Researching Japanese War Crimes - Introductory Essays (pp. 102-110). Nazi War Crimes and Japanese Imperial Government Records. Interagency Working Group, Washington DC, 2006.

Footnotes

1890 births
1947 deaths
Executed military leaders
Military personnel from Ehime Prefecture
Imperial Japanese Army generals of World War II
Japanese mass murderers
Japanese military personnel of World War II
Japanese people executed for war crimes
Japanese cannibals
Japanese people executed abroad
People executed by the United States military by hanging
Recipients of the Order of the Sacred Treasure, 2nd class
Executed mass murderers